Crataegus alabamensis, the Alabama hawthorn, is a species of flowering plant in the family Rosaceae, native to the southeastern United States. It can be distinguished from other hawthorns by its "beautifully formed" leaves with pronounced crenato-serrate margins.

References

alabamensis
Endemic flora of the United States
Flora of Louisiana
Flora of Mississippi
Flora of Alabama
Flora of Florida
Flora of Georgia (U.S. state)
Flora of South Carolina
Flora of North Carolina
Plants described in 1900